The Emirates Airlines South Africa Sevens is played annually as part of the IRB Sevens World Series for international rugby sevens (seven-a-side version of rugby union). The 2008 competition, took place on 5 December and 6 December at Outeniqua Park in George, Western Cape, it was the second Cup trophy in the 2008–09 IRB Sevens World Series.

Teams

Pool stages

Pool A
{| class="wikitable" style="text-align: center;"
|-
!width="200"|Team
!width="40"|Pld
!width="40"|W
!width="40"|D
!width="40"|L
!width="40"|PF
!width="40"|PA
!width="40"|+/-
!width="40"|Pts
|- 
|align=left| 
|3||3||0||0||95||12||+83||9
|-
|align=left| 
|3||2||0||1||70||33||+37||7
|-
|align=left| 
|3||1||0||2||31||75||−44||5
|-
|align=left| 
|3||0||0||3||21||97||−66||3
|}

Pool B
{| class="wikitable" style="text-align: center;"
|-
!width="200"|Team
!width="40"|Pld
!width="40"|W
!width="40"|D
!width="40"|L
!width="40"|PF
!width="40"|PA
!width="40"|+/-
!width="40"|Pts
|- 
|align=left| 
|3||3||0||0||72||12||+60||9
|-
|align=left| 
|3||2||0||1||66||50||+16||7
|-
|align=left| 
|3||1||0||2||59||50||+9||5
|-
|align=left| 
|3||0||0||3||10||95||−85||3
|}

Pool C
{| class="wikitable" style="text-align: center;"
|-
!width="200"|Team
!width="40"|Pld
!width="40"|W
!width="40"|D
!width="40"|L
!width="40"|PF
!width="40"|PA
!width="40"|+/-
!width="40"|Pts
|- 
|align=left| 
|3||3||0||0||81||21||+60||9
|-
|align=left| 
|3||2||0||1||47||38||+9||7
|-
|align=left| 
|3||1||0||2||43||57||−14||5
|- 
|align=left| 
|3||0||0||3||7||62||−55||3
|}

Pool D
{| class="wikitable" style="text-align: center;"
|-
!width="200"|Team
!width="40"|Pld
!width="40"|W
!width="40"|D
!width="40"|L
!width="40"|PF
!width="40"|PA
!width="40"|+/-
!width="40"|Pts
|-
|align=left| 
|3||3||0||0||52||46||+6||9
|- 
|align=left| 
|3||2||0||1||65||36||+29||7
|-
|align=left| 
|3||1||0||2||43||43||0||5
|-
|align=left| 
|3||0||0||3||34||69||−35||3
|}

Knockout

Shield

Bowl

Plate

Cup

Statistics

Individual points

Individual tries

References

External links 
 
 IRB Sevens
 South Africa 7s on irb.com

South Africa
South Africa Sevens
Sevens